Will Wallace is an American film director and actor. He directed Spanish Fly, Red Wing, and Cake: A Wedding Story.

Early life
Wallace graduated from Kent School in 1984.

Career 
As an actor, Will Wallace received his first role playing a flight attendant opposite of Shirley MacLaine in The Evening Star in 1996. He had a number of guest starring in television hits, such as, Beverly Hills, 90210 in 1998 where he played Barry. The following year he was cast in Baywatch in 1999 where he played Sam. That same year he was cast as Lieutenant Chadway in Pensacola: Wings of Gold.

In 1998, Will booked the role of Private Hoke in Terrance Malick’s film, The Thin Red Line (1998 film). In 2001, Will played Bill Carpenter, husband to Laura Dern’s character Randy in the heartfelt movie I Am Sam.

In 2013, Will Wallace produced and directed a unique love story, Red Wing, which was an adaptation from the French novella François le Champi by George Sand. It is set in a small town in Texas. In the film, a young boy is taken in by a foster family and grows up to fall in love with his foster mother. The film has a number of critically acclaimed actors from Luke Perry, Frances Fisher, Bill Paxton, and a young Glen Powell. It was released by Warner Brothers and is currently available On Demand. Wallace was awarded the first Key to the City of Corsicana, TX by Mayor Don Denbow on Oct 18, 2018 after producing the film Warning Shot in the city.

References

External links

American film directors
Kent School alumni
Living people
Year of birth missing (living people)